"Younger" is a song recorded by Australian singer-songwriter Ruel and produced by M-Phazes. The song was released on 8 June 2018 as the third single from Ruel's debut extended play, Ready (2018). In October 2018, the song was certified gold in Australia; his first certification, and platinum in March 2019.

Upon release, Ruel said “I wrote "Younger" at my AirBNB in Los Angeles with my mate Sarah Aarons. We were talking about how friends part ways over time because of different interests or family life and I really liked that concept for a song. I definitely relate to this story personally and I feel like most people have gone through this kind of scenario too.”

Music video
The music video for "Younger" was released on 2 August 2018 and is a short film directed by visual artist and three-time collaborator Grey Ghost. It depicts a friendship on the rocks that takes a turn for the worst after a fateful physical altercation. Ruel told Billboard. “The storyline in the "Younger" video isn't a direct reinterpretation of the lyrics—so instead of it being about you and your mate choosing different paths over time, it's about choosing your own path.”

Track listing
One-track single 
 "Younger" – 3:42

Charts

Weekly charts

Year-end charts

Certifications

Release history

References
 

2018 singles
2018 songs
Ruel (singer) songs
RCA Records singles
Songs written by Sarah Aarons
Songs written by Ruel (singer)